Tilloloy is a commune in the Somme department in Hauts-de-France in northern France.

Geography

Population

Personalities
 Blaise Cendrars recounts in  "La Main coupée" that the Foreign Legion squad he commanded in 1916 rested up in Tilloloy.

Places of interest
 The village church (shown in the lede image), which was subject of a painting by artist Maurice Denis.
 The seventeenth-century château of Tilloloy; extensively damaged in the First World War, subsequently restored.

See also
Communes of the Somme department

References

Communes of Somme (department)